Hohendubrau is a municipality in the district Görlitz, Saxony, Germany.

The larger part of the municipality belongs to the recognized Sorbian settlement area in Saxony. Upper Sorbian has an official status next to German, all villages bear names in both languages.

References 

Municipalities in Saxony
Populated places in Görlitz (district)